Marcel de Mendonça Marques (born 26 July 1996) is a Brazilian futsal player who plays as a winger for Inter FS and the Brazilian national futsal team.

Career
Marcel Marques started his career in his hometown team, Corinthians, but soon joined Sorocaba where he stayed for two years before moving to Spanish futsal powerhouse Inter FS.

References

External links
Liga Nacional Fútbol Sala profile
Liga Nacional de Futsal profile

1996 births
Living people
Brazilian men's futsal players